Lake Barrine is a rural locality in the Tablelands Region, Queensland, Australia.

Geography 
The locality is on the Atherton Tableland. It takes its name from the lake of the same name in the west of the locality, which in turn comes from the Aboriginal word "barrang", meaning big water. The lake and surrounding area is part of the Crater Lakes National Park. The rest of the locality is used for farming.

History 
In the 1880s, there was logging of the rainforest timbers. However, concern about the potential loss of large kauri and cedar pines near the lake led to the establishment of a scenic reserve in 1888 to protect the trees. In 1920, George and Margaret Curry established a tourism business with lake cruises and a tea house. The completion of the Cairns Range Road (now known as the Gillies Highway) from Gordonvale to Atherton in 1926 provided much better access to the area for tourists. In 1934, the Queensland Government created the Lake Barrine National Park.

The Lakebank State School opened on 18 July 1922. In 1936 it was renamed Lake Barrine State School. It closed  on 30 June 1949.

During World War II, air raids on Australian towns by Japan and the fear of an invasion by the Japanese led to evacuations from northern Australian towns. In March 1942, the students of St Augustine's College in Cairns were evacuated to the guest house at Lake Barrine. In late 1942, Lieutenant General Thomas Blamey decided to establish army facilities on the Atherton Tableland for the recuperation and training of troops returning from the Middle East to defend Australia against the Japanese. With 40,000 troops on the Atherton Tableland, Lake Barrine became an important recreational facility and the guest house was used by the 2/1 Australian Army Convalescent Depot. After the war ended, the Curry family resumed their tourist business at the lake.

In 1994, the Queensland Government merged the Lake Barrine National Park and the Lake Eacham National Park to form Crater Lakes National Park.

Education 
There are no schools in Lake Barrine. The nearest public primary school is Yungaburra State School. The nearest public secondary schools are Atherton State High School and Malanda State High School.

References 

Tablelands Region
Localities in Queensland